Zinc finger CCCH domain-containing protein 13 is a protein that in humans is encoded by the ZC3H13 gene.

References

Further reading